The Battle of the Crna Bend  was a major military engagement fought between the forces of the Central Powers and the Entente in May 1917. It was part of the Allied Spring Offensive of the same year that was designed to break the stalemate on the Macedonian Front. Despite the considerable numerical and matériel advantage of the attackers over the defenders, the Bulgarian and German defense of the positions in the loop of the river Crna remained a very formidable obstacle, which the Allies were unable to defeat not only in 1917 but until the end of the war itself.

Background

With the onset of the winter of 1916 all military operations on the Macedonian Front came to an abrupt end. The three-month-long Monastir Offensive provided the Allies with only limited tactical successes but it failed to knockout Bulgaria out of the war by a combined attack of General Sarrail's forces and the Romanian Army. On strategic level the overall result of the offensive was that it managed to keep over half of the Bulgarian Army and few German units on the Macedonian Front. On tactical level the front line was moved in favor of the Allies by only about 50 kilometers in the Sector of General Winkler's 11th German-Bulgarian Army. By the end of November however the Bulgarians and Germans were able to firmly establish themselves on the Chervena Stena – height 1248 – Hill 1050 – Dabica – Gradešnica defensive line and subsequently repel all Allied attempts to dislodge them of their positions. This brought about the stabilization of the entire front line and forced the Allies to call off the offensive altogether. The opposing sides were now free to regroup their exhausted forces and fortify their lines.

The strategic situation in the early spring of 1917 on all European theaters of war, except the Romanian portion of the Eastern Front, favored the implementation of the Allied offensive plans that were adopted during the inter-allied conference of November 1916 held in Chantilly, France. These plans included an offensive on the Macedonian Front designed to support main the Allied efforts on the other fronts and if possible completely defeat Bulgaria with the assistance of Russian and Romanian forces. The Bulgarians on their part asked the Germans to join an offensive against Salonika with six divisions but the German High Command refused and forced the adoption of a purely defensive stance of the Central Powers forces on the Balkan Front.

Preparations

Allied plan

The commander of the Allied armies on the Salonika front General Sarrail commenced preparations for the offensive as soon as he received his orders. By early spring 1917 he produced a general plan that envisaged a main attack delivered in the Serbian sector by the Serbian 2nd Army and at least two other secondary attacks – the first by the British to the east of the Vardar and the second by the Italians and French in the Crna Bend. French and Greek forces to the west of the Vardar were also to undertake aggressive action. The commander of the French Army of the East General Paul Grossetti informed his superior that his forces would need at least 40 days to prepare for the operations which forced General Sarrail to set the start of the offensive for the 12 of April 1917. The bad weather conditions however soon forced him to change the starting date several times until it was determined that the British main attack should commence on 24 of April and the rest on 30 of April. In accordance the British began the 2nd Battle of Doiran according to schedule but were soon forced to call off their attacks as it became clear that the rest of the Allies were not able to deliver their attacks on time. The dates for the attacks were finally set for the 5 of May in the Crna Bend and 8 of May in the Serbian and British sectors.

In the Crna Bend sector the planned attack was assigned to the left right of the French Army of the East – the so-called First Group of Divisions(under the command of General Georges Lebouc) and to the Italian Expeditionary Force. Its primary task was to penetrate all Bulgarian and German lines in the direction of the town of Prilep and thus threaten the rear of the Bulgarian forces around the Vardar and Monastir. General Sarrail had surveyed the area and determined that the Italians and French should deliver a frontal assault against almost the entire length of the defensive line which caused serious doubt about the final success of the operation among the Italian and French commanders. In order to strengthen the Allies Sarrail also attached a Russian infantry brigade to the Crna sector forces a few days before the attack.

Central Powers plan

The Bulgarians and Germans were well aware of the impending Allied offensive and decided to rely on the strength of their well prepared fortifications, strong artillery and machine gun fire while also placing as many troops as possible in the first lines and preparing sufficient reserves in case the Allies achieved a breakthrough and the need for strong counter-attacks arose. The task of the defenders was to preserve their positions at all costs and protect the important lines of communication running along the Gradsko-Prilep road.
On February 12, the Germans had already launched a successful attack on Italian forces west of Hill 1050 using flamethrowers.
Italian counterattacks the next day and on February 27, were only partly successful.

Opposing forces

Central Powers

The Crna Bend was considered one of the most important sectors on the Macedonian Front and was always guarded by strong Bulgarian and German units. In 1917 the Central Powers forces in the area were part of the 62nd Corps of the 11th German-Bulgarian Army, both of which were commanded by German generals and staff. The first-line units assigned to the sector, along a 23 kilometer front, were the 302nd Division and the 22nd German-Bulgarian Brigade. These forces occupied a generally well fortified line which was especially strong in the points that were considered crucial for the defense such as Hill 1050, Hill 1060, Dabica etc. In such places the defense consisted of complicated networks of trenches protected by several lines of barbed wire that were each usually 3–5 meters thick but in some places reached a thickness of 10–15 meters. In addition there were good infantry shelters that were connected to each other by communication trenches. The troops were well supplied with ammunition and their morale was high.

First-line troops
302nd Infantry Division (Hermann von Ziegesar)
2/2 Infantry Brigade – 9 battalions(5,550+ rifles), 32 machine guns
201st Infantry Brigade(German) – 7 battalions, 74 machine guns
3/7 Infantry Brigade – 4 battalions(2800 rifles), 22 machine guns
18th Artillery Regiment – 20 guns
10th Artillery Regiment(German) – 26 guns, 4 mortars
Divisional Reserve – 2 battalions(German), 6 machine guns

22nd German-Bulgarian Infantry Brigade (von Reuter)
42nd Infantry Regiment(German) – 2 battalions, 39 machine guns
44th Infantry Regiment – 3 battalions(2,600 rifles), 16 machine guns
28th Infantry Regiment – 3 battalions(2,300 rifles), 16 machine guns
German Artillery Group – 16 guns
Bulgarian Artillery Group – 28 guns

Total first-line troops – 30 battalions, 205 machine guns, 90 guns  

Second-line troops
61st Corps Reserve
146th Infantry Regiment(German) – 2 battalions, 12 machine guns
Bulgarian and German artillery – 32 guns,

Third-line troops
Army reserve
2/8 Infantry Brigade – 8 battalions, 29 machine guns

Total troops in the Crna Bend sector – 40 battalions, 246 machine guns, 122 guns

Allies

The Allied position in the Crna Bend were occupied by troops of various nationality. The western part of the sector was entrusted to the Italian Expeditionary Force which faced parts of the 302nd division along a 10,5 kilometer front. The remaining part of the sector was in the hands of the I Group of Divisions which also had to cover a 10,5 kilometer front line. By the beginning of May the Allies managed to concentrate a large force of infantry and artillery that outnumbered the Bulgarians and Germans.

First-line troops
35th Italian Infantry Division (General Giuseppe Pennella)
Sicilia Infantry Brigade – 6 battalions(4,710 rifles), 51 machine guns
Ivrea Infantry Brigade – 6 battalions(4,143 rifles), 48 machine guns
Cagliari Infantry Brigade – 6 battalions(5,954 rifles), 72 machine guns
Artillery – 144 guns

16th French Colonial Infantry Division (General Antoine Dessort)
4th Infantry Brigade – 6 battalions, 48 machine guns
32nd Infantry Brigade – 6 battalions, 48 machine guns
Artillery – 78 guns

2nd Russian Infantry Brigade (Mikhail Dieterichs)
4th Infantry Regiment – 3 battalions, 16 machine guns
3rd Infantry Regiment – 3 battalions, 16 machine guns
Artillery – 54 guns

17th French Colonial Infantry Division (General Georges Têtart)
33rd Infantry Brigade – 6 battalions, 48 machine guns
34th Infantry Brigade – 6 battalions, 48 machine guns
Artillery – 50 guns

Attached heavy artillery – 46 guns

Total first-line troops – 48 battalions, 395 machine guns, 372 guns

Second-line troops
11th French Colonial Infantry Division (General Jean Paul Sicre)
22nd Infantry Brigade – 6 battalions, 48 machine guns
157th Infantry Regiment – 3 battalions, 24 machine guns
African Chasseur  Regiment – 3 battalions, ? machine guns
Artillery – 8 guns

Third-line troops
Reserve of the commander-in-chief
30th French Colonial Infantry Division – 9 battalions, 48 machine guns, 32 guns

Total troops in the Crna Bend sector – 69 battalions, c. 515 machine guns, 412 guns

Battle

Artillery preparation

The Allied command planned to open the battle with an artillery bombardment scheduled for the 5 of May 1917. On that day 91 Italian and French batteries(372 guns and heavy mortars) opened fire along the entire front of the 302nd Division and the 22nd Brigade. Due to the calm and warm weather the entire defensive line was soon engulfed in a cloud of smoke and dust. The barrage lasted for the entire day and had mixed effects, depending on the ground and strength of the fortifications it was directed at. This was the case in the sector of the 302nd Division where the Bulgarian 2/2nd Infantry Brigade was defending lines situated in a flat plain and the shelters were not enough for all the soldiers. By contrast the bombardment hardly made an impression on the German 201st Infantry Brigade which occupied the important hills 1020 and 1050. Its infantry benefited from the rugged terrain and the excellent shelters, that were in some cases dug in the solid rock. The Allied artillery fire in the sector of the Bulgarian 3/7 Infantry Brigade caused serious damage on part of the barbed wire and collapsed several infantry shelters. Von Reuter's troops were also exposed to the heavy bombardment and had some of their first-line trenches and barbed wire severely damaged. The Allied artillery on this part of the front was forced to pause its barrage for some time in the afternoon due to the appearance of German fighter aircraft and the destruction of one of their observation balloons. With the coming of the night the Allied fire was significantly reduced in intensity which gave a chance to the defenders to repair part of the inflicted damage.

At 6:00 On 6 of May the Allied artillery renewed its bombardment and continued in the same manner as the day before throughout the entire day. This time however the Italians, French and Russians also sent patrols to check the effect of the bombardment on the Bulgarian-German lines and test the strength of the fortifications. The Bulgarians and Germans managed to hold off their attempts to close on the lines by strong infantry and artillery fire. On this day the Central Powers artillery took a more active part in the battle and often engaged in counter-infantry and counter-battery work with the help of German reconnaissance planes. By the end of the day the Allied artillery once again reduced the intensity of its
fire.

In the morning on 7 of May the Allies renewed their bombardment once again. On this day the barrage was even more powerful than the previous days and the Italian and French guns fired more than 15,000 shells on the lines of the Bulgarian 2/2nd Infantry Brigade alone. Stronger reconnaissance patrols were dispatched but were once again held of by the Bulgarians and Germans, who answered with sending their own patrols to determine weather the Allies were preparing for a major infantry attack. The results of the three-day artillery barrage proved unsatisfactory and General Grossetti decided that it should be continued on the 8 of May with the help of four observation balloons. The day for the main infantry attack was finally set for the 9 of May.

Overall the results of the four-day preliminary artillery bombardment proved unsatisfactory. The Allied fire did not cause severe damage to the Bulgarian and German defensive line while the greater focus of the artillery fire on some points of the line gave a clear indication of the directions where the main attack was to be delivered. The defenders also used every possible moment to repair the damage to their fortifications under the cover of their own artillery. The Bulgarian and German artillery and its observations posts were practically untouched by the Allied bombardment. While the Bulgarian infantry units suffered 945 casualties during the four day of bombardment, the  losses of the artillery were only 10 men killed or wounded and several guns damaged or destroyed.

Infantry assault

The beginning of the infantry attack was set by the Allied command for 6:30 on 9 of May and as the infantry prepared the artillery resumed its barrage with much greater vigor, once again engulfing the entire defensive line in a cloud of smoke and dust. At precisely 6:30 the Italian, French and Russian infantry moved out of their trenches and advanced against the Bulgarian and German positions along an 11-kilometer long line.

The assault of the 35th Division

The 35th Italian Infantry Division attacked the Bulgarian 2/2 Infantry Brigade and German 201st Infantry Brigade with its Sicilia and Ivrea infantry brigades(61st, 62nd, 161st and 162nd infantry regiments). The focal points of the assault were the powerful positions on Hill 1020 and Hill 1050. To the right parts of the 61st regiment took advantage of the dust cloud, left by the barrage, and managed to capture a forward trench that the Bulgarians had evacuated in order to preserve their infantry from the Allied artillery fire. The Bulgarian infantry responded soon after with a counter-attack that pushed back the Italians and recaptured the trench. Meanwhile, further to the right of these events the troops of the Italian 61st Regiment advanced against the Bulgarian I/9 infantry battalion but were repulsed by artillery fire. The 1st and 3rd battalions of this regiment however had greater success and managed to take control the first-line trench of the 9th German Jäger Battalion, between Hill 1020 and Hill 1050. The Italian soldiers continued advancing towards the second-line of trenches and succeeded in entering it because most of the defenders were still in the trenches and galleries on the northern slopes of hills 1020 and 1050. Soon after the Bulgarian and German rifle, machine gun and artillery fire intensified and caused heavy casualties to the attackers as it hit the Italians not only from their front but also from their flanks. The commander of the 3rd Battalion Major Tonti was killed. At 7:40 the commander of the Jägers requested reinforcements from the neighboring Bulgarian units and counter-attacked as soon as they arrived. The Germans and Bulgarians quickly regained control of their lost trenches(capturing 120 prisoners in the process), forcing the Italian 61st Regiment to fall back to  its starting positions.

In the center of the Italian front of attack the 161st Infantry Regiment was tasked with taking Hill 1050 but its advance met with a strong barrage delivered by the Bulgarian artillery. Still parts of the left flank and center of the regiment reached the first trenches  while another detachment succeeded in getting round the hill from the east. While they advanced these troops were also subjected to very heavy artillery, trench-mortar and  machine-gun fire which was the prelude for a counter-attack delivered by the German Guard Jaegers that saw the entire Italian regiment thrown back to its original positions. During the Italian attack and German counter-attack the  161st Regiment suffered very heavy losses. One of its infantry companies was almost completely destroyed by the explosion of a mine that was laid in the trenches by the defenders.

On the right of the Italian front the attacking 162nd Italian regiment suffered much the same fate as the other attacking forces. It attacked a hill defended by troops of the German 45th Infantry Regiment and initially succeeded in overcoming the barbed wire and occupying part of the first line of trenches. To their right however the 16th French Colonial Division failed to permanently capture an important hill Piton Rocheaux which left the Italian flank unsupported and vulnerable. As result the Italians were met by a very heavy artillery, machine-gun and hand-grenade fire from behind, and by machine-gun fire coming from their right flank. This  obliged them to fall back to their own starting trenches. By this time the total losses of the Ivrea Brigade(161st and 162nd regiments) were 40 officers and around 1000 soldiers.

Thus the first assault on the Bulgarian and German positions ended in almost complete failure. General Pennella ordered the attack to be resumed with the help of the divisional artillery. At 9:45 the Italian infantrymen once again moved forward but as conditions hadn't improved in their favor, they achieved no better success and once again suffered heavy losses. By midday the attack had died off and General Pennella postponed it. By the end of the day the Italians had lost between 2,400 and 2700 men, which amounted to about 21% of the committed infantry. One Italian observation balloon was also lost. During the infantry attack on 9 of May the Allied artillery in the Italian sector fired 31,235 shells against the defenders.

The assault in the French sector

The 16th French Colonial Infantry Division, which was neighboring the Italian 35th Division to its east, was ordered to attack with its 12 battalions the positions of the Bulgarian 3/7 Infantry Brigade and parts of the German 201st Infantry Brigade (6 Bulgarian and German battalions in total). The artillery preparation for the attack began at 4:30 and peaked in intensity about an hour later. The Allied bombardment destroyed many of the Bulgarian forward infantry observation posts, caused damage to the fortifications and covered the three hills, that were the objectives of the attack, in a dense cloud of smoke and dust. At 6:30 the French infantry advanced with three regiments in the first line and one regiment in reserve.

On the right the 8th Colonial Infantry Regiment assaulted the hill "Dalag Greben"(its French designation was Piton Rocheaux) and infiltrated the trenches defended by two battalion of the German 201st Infantry Brigade. Following a costly hand-to-hand engagement however the French were driven out which left the flank of the attacking Italians to the left of these positions exposed and contributed to their defeat.

In the center the 4th Colonial Regiment moved against the hill named by the Bulgarians "Shtabna Visochina"(its French designation was Piton Jaune)and managed to advance without initially being spotted as many of the Bulgarian observes had been killed or wounded. The few that had survived the French bombardment however were able to fire their red flairs and signal the defenders as the attackers reached the barbed wire lines. Almost immediately the Bulgarian infantry came out from its shelters or hide-outs into the trenches and opened heavy rifle and machine gun fire on the French. This caught the first wave of attackers by surprise and forced to retreat which in turn caused the next two waves of French infantry to waver and eventually withdraw. While they were retreating the French came under Bulgarian artillery fire and suffered heavy casualties.

To the right the French 37th Colonial Regiment had better luck and managed to enter and occupy the trenches on Hill "Vaskova Visochina"(Tranchees rouges) undetected where they placed in position several machine guns. The reason for this was that nearby Bulgarian infantry was still mostly in its shelters. A general alert was sounded when an observer from a nearby Bulgarian company spotted the French. The troops of the Bulgarian battalion, that was responsible for the defense of the hill, immediately came out of their shelters and counter-attacked under a hail of rifle and machine gun bullets. With the help of some Bulgarian machin guns who were firing at the exposed French flank the Bulgarians managed to reach and enter the trenches where a difficult hand-to-hand combat ensued. Many Bulgarian officers were killed, including the battalion commander captain Vaskov. The counter-attack also began drawing in the battalions reserves, positioned some 600 meters to the north, that attempted to advance against the French flanks. On the left the Bulgarians managed to enter the trenches occupied by the French and neutralize or capture some of their machine guns. As more Bulgarian infantry and German machine guns became involved in the counter-attack the soldiers of the 37th Colonial Regiment were finally forced to abandon the hill and retreat.

By 8:00 the attack of the 16th Colonial Division was beaten along the entire defensive line. Thus at 9:00 the division reinforced its attacking units and began a second attack against the hills "Shtabna Visochina" and "Vaskova Visochina" which was once again defeated. The losses of the Bulgarian 3/7 Infantry Brigade for the day were 134 killed and 276 wounded. The brigade captured 44 French troops in a half-drunken state and reported that its soldiers had counted 725 killed French soldiers. A few days following the attack General Sarrail reported a total of around 1,000 casualties in the 16th Colonial division for the attack on 9 of May.   
     
Further to the east of the 16th Colonial Division was the French 17th Colonial Division. On 9 of May this division was tasked with attacking the positions of the 22nd German-Bulgarian Infantry Brigade in conjunction with the Russian 2nd Independent Infantry Brigade. The artillery preparation in this sector began at 5:15 in the morning(guided by and observation balloon) and reached peak intensity at about 6:00 when it covered most of the German and Bulgarian lines. At precisely 6:30 the barrage lifted from the first line of trenches and moved on to their rear. At this moment the French infantry advanced in three waves with three regiments in the first line and one in reserve. Halfway across no man's land the attackers were spotted by Bulgarian artillery men and subjected to heavy artillery shelling. While one part of the attacking French soldiers were killed, wounded or seeking cover another part successfully reached and entered the first line of Bulgarian and German trenches. There they engaged the defenders in hand-to-hand combat but were defeated and pushed back. The French failed to take the important position named "Caesar" which gave a tactical advantage to the defenders who could concentrate their efforts on deflecting the Russian attack. At 8:45 the first French assault was decisively beaten. At 11:00 the French infantry attempted another attack but only 15 minutes later were forced to withdraw to their starting positions. The soldiers that were captured by the Bulgarians were found to be half-drunk and their canteens filled with wine or liqueur. A third French attack was carried out in the afternoon but was once again beaten back by 18:00. The total casualties suffered by the 17th Colonial Division during the day were about 700 men.

Assault of the Russian 2nd Independent Infantry Brigade

Out of the 18 battalions detailed for the attacked on the positions of the 22nd German-Bulgarian Infantry Brigade 6 belonged to the Russian 2nd Independent Infantry Brigade of General Dietrichs. This brigade was added to the Franco-Italian group in the Crna Bend a short time before the beginning of the Allied offensive. It occupied part of the front situated between the French 16th and 17th colonial divisions.

On 9 of May the Russian infantry began its attack on the German and Bulgarian lines at 6:30, in close cooperation with the neighboring 17th Colonial Division. On the right flank of the brigade the 3rd Infantry Regiment advanced against the "Heintselman" hill which was occupied a battalion of the German 42nd Infantry Regiment while at the same time on the left flank the  4th Infantry Regiment attacked the important Hill "Dabica" which was defended by another battalion of the German 42nd Infantry Regiment. As soon as the Russians were spotted the German and Bulgarian artillery opened fire on their advancing waves of infantry which allowed only parts of the Russian 3rd Regiment to enter the "Heitselman" trenches while most of its soldiers had sought cover next to the barbed wire before the hill itself. At Dabica however the German artillery proved too weak to halt the attack of the Russian 4th Infantry Regiment, whose troops successfully penetrated into the main trench with the help of hand grenades and advanced so rapidly through it that by 8:00 the entire hill fell under their control. As result the headquarters of the 22nd German-Bulgarian lost connection with its troops in the area and received no clear information about the situation until late in the afternoon. While many of the German defenders managed to retreat from the hill and gathered around by the Bulgarian reserve, the Russians also took 4 German officers and 74 German soldiers from the  II/42 German  battalion as prisoners.

The capture of Dabica was the greatest and most important Allied achievement of the battle. Unfortunately for the Russians this success was not expanded because the attack of the French against the "Caesar" position failed which allowed the Germans and Bulgarians to clear "Heintselman" of Russian presence. Thus by 8:45 most of the first major Allied attack was completely repelled leaving only Dabica in Russian hands. The situation of the 4th Regiment remained serious because the Bulgarians and Germans were encircling it from three sides.

At 14:40 the commander of the Franco-Russian forces General Lebouc ordered the Russian Brigade to attack and capture "Heintselman" with its 3rd Regiment while the 17th Colonial Division carried out a new assault against "Caesar". The attack, which was scheduled for 17:30, was preceded by a very short but powerful artillery barrage which caused damaged to the defensive line. Still once the attacking Russian and French infantry moved out of its trenches and reached the Bulgarian barbed wire it was hit by a very powerful artillery bombardment, coming from the nearby Bulgarian and German batteries, which caused great confusion among its ranks. Thus three consecutive waves of attacking infantry were driven back to their starting trenches and the Russian infantry which managed to get to "Heintselman" was decisively repelled by its German defenders. By 18:00 the attack was called off all together.

Despite this setback the Russians continued to hold their positions on "Dabitsa" but the initiative was now in German and Bulgarian hands. The commander of the 22nd Infantry Brigade colonel von Reuter planned to retake his lost positions by attacking from both the west and east sides of "Dabica". The artillery preparation for the attack began at 19:40 and delivered a devastating bombardment on the Russian positions. Under its cover at 19:55 the infantry counter-attack began with the German Jägers attacking from the west and the Bulgarians attacking from the east. The Russian positions proved untenable and by 20:10 the Germans and Bulgarians linked up on top of the hill.

With the recapture of "Dabica" the integrity of the entire defensive line in the Crna Bend sector was restored and the battle on 9 of May ended in decisive victory for the Central Powers. Russian casualties were heavy and ranged from 975 to 1325 men killed or wounded.

Aftermath

During the decisive Allied infantry assault the Bulgarians suffered 681 men killed or wounded, most of them in the 302nd division, which brought their total losses to 1,626 men for the period from 5 to 9 of May 1917. German losses during the attack are unknown but it is likely that they were heavy because the German units were usually caught in the thick of the fighting. The Allies on the other hand had sustained some 5,450 casualties during the attack on 9 of May for no gain at all.

Despite the failure Generail Sarrail was not ready to give up on his offensive and new attacks were made by the Italians and French in the Crna Bend on 11 and 17 of May which ended in failure. Finally following the French defeat around Monastir and the British defeat at Lake Doiran General Sarrail called off the entire offensive on 21 of May.

References

Sources

In Bulgarian
 

In English:
 
 

In Russian:
 
 (In Russian)

Battles of the Balkans Theatre (World War I)
Battles of World War I involving Bulgaria
Battles of World War I involving France
Battles of World War I involving Germany
Battles of World War I involving Italy
Battles of World War I involving Russia
Military history of North Macedonia
Conflicts in 1917
May 1917 events